High Hopes, also billed as Nice Guys, is a 2006 film directed by Joe Eckardt.

Plot
Hollywood hopeful Tom Murphy and his posse of pals conspire to get into the big leagues. Pinning their hopes of industry success on Tom's famous girlfriend starring in their first feature, falls to pieces when she dumps him. Tom and his pals learn of another possibility and devise a plan to steal a fenced case of government issued marijuana, return it to the FBI and use the reward money to finance their movie. Little do they know a scorned girlfriend and her deaf mute brother have other plans.

Cast
Jason Mewes as Quebert
Lacey Chabert as Cindy
Andy Dick as Patrick
Danny Trejo as Shady
Jennifer Finnigan as Morgan
Edward Furlong as Tye
Robert Rodriguez as Mr. Lewis
Dallas Page as Sleezy Guy
David Faustino as Ben
Corin Nemec as Tom Murphy
Michael DeLorenzo as Rocko
Jason Marsden as Wendell
Gina DeVettori as Carly
Cecily Gambrell as Julie
Ted Raimi as Special Agent Brown

References

External links

2006 films
2006 comedy films
American comedy films
2000s English-language films
2000s American films